Up in Smoke is a 1978 film featuring Cheech and Chong.

Up in Smoke may also refer to:

 Up in Smoke (album), the soundtrack to the 1978 film
 "Up in Smoke", title track from the 1978 album and the film's theme song, originally recorded by Cheech and Chong, later covered by Hank Williams III on his 2006 album Straight to Hell
 Up in Smoke (album), a 1995 album by Indo G and Lil' Blunt
 Up in Smoke (1957 film), starring the comedy team of The Bowery Boys
 Up in Smoke (2015 film), starring Naathan Phan
 "Up in Smoke" (CSI: Crime Scene Investigation), a sixth-season episode of CSI: Crime Scene Investigation
 "Up in Smoke" (NCIS), a ninth-season episode of NCIS
 Up in Smoke Tour, a West Coast hip hop tour which took place in 2000 
 Up in Smoke, an alternate name used by the professional wrestling tag team Cheech and Cloudy
 "Up in Smoke", a song by Hollywood Undead from Notes from the Underground
 "Up in Smoke", a song by Lower Than Atlantis from World Record
 "Up in Smoke", a song by Neck Deep from A History of Bad Decisions